Brian Quailey (born 21 March 1978) is a retired professional footballer who played as a striker. Born in England, he represented the Saint Kitts and Nevis U23 national team internationally.

Club career
Born in Leicester, Quailey played for Nuneaton Borough, West Bromwich Albion, Exeter City, Blackpool, Scunthorpe United, Doncaster Rovers, Halifax Town, Tamworth, Stevenage Borough and Stafford Rangers.

At the end of the 2001–02 season he was offered a new contract by Scunthorpe United in April 2002, but was released by the club in July 2002. He had an unsuccessful trial at Rushden & Diamonds later that month, before signing for Doncaster Rovers on non-contract terms in August 2002. He signed for Halifax Town on non-contract terms in September 2002, leaving them in May 2003 after signing a two-year contract with Nuneaton Borough. He then moved to Tamworth in November 2003, before signing for Stevenage Borough in April 2004. After spending a loan spell at Nuneaton Borough, he signed permanently for the club in March 2005. He moved to Stafford Rangers in July 2006. After another spell at Nuneaton in October 2008, he was linked with a transfer to Atherstone Town in December 2008.

International career
Quailey played for Saint Kitts and Nevis at under-23 level.

References

1978 births
Living people
Black British sportspeople
English sportspeople of Saint Kitts and Nevis descent
Saint Kitts and Nevis footballers
English footballers
Association football forwards
English Football League players
Nuneaton Borough F.C. players
West Bromwich Albion F.C. players
Exeter City F.C. players
Blackpool F.C. players
Scunthorpe United F.C. players
Doncaster Rovers F.C. players
Halifax Town A.F.C. players
Tamworth F.C. players
Stevenage F.C. players
Stafford Rangers F.C. players